Philip Gregory Hubbard (born December 13, 1956) is an American former professional basketball player and coach. He won a gold medal in the 1976 Summer Olympics and after graduating from the University of Michigan, played for the Detroit Pistons and Cleveland Cavaliers of the National Basketball Association (NBA) from 1979 to 1989. Hubbard later served as an assistant coach for the Washington Wizards from 2003–2009 and as the head coach of the Los Angeles D-Fenders in 2014–15.

High school career
Hubbard played high school basketball at Canton McKinley High School in Canton, Ohio.  He was named Ohio player of the year in 1975 while at McKinley.

College career 
He played college basketball for the Michigan Wolverines under Coach Johnny Orr. 
As a freshman at Michigan, he helped lead the Wolverines to the 1976 NCAA Championship Game against Indiana University. Hubbard averaged 15.1 points and 11.0 rebounds, playing alongside Rickey Green as the Wolverines had the second-place finish at the 1976 NCAA Championship. 

Hubbard was an All-American in 1977, leading the Wolverines (26–4) to the Big Ten championship. Hubbard averaged 19.5 points and 13.0 rebounds. His 389 total rebounds in the 1976–77 season remains the single season record at Michigan.

A serious knee injury, suffered in the World University Games, required surgery and forced Hubbard to miss his entire junior year at Michigan, The knee injury would affect the rest of his career.

In 88 career games at Michigan (1975–1979), Hubbard averaged a double-double of 16.5 points and 11.1 rebounds on 53% shooting from the floor and 63% from the line.

1976 Olympic Team 
Hubbard was a member of the Team USA, the 1976 United States men's Olympic basketball team that won the gold medal in the 1976 Olympic Games under Coach Dean Smith. Hubbard averaged 4.7 points and 3.8 rebounds on 52% shooting from the floor and 100% from the line during the Olympics.  Hubbard had 10 points in the gold medal game against Yugoslavia.

NBA career

Detroit (1979–1982) 
Hubbard was selected by the Detroit Pistons in the 1st round (15th overall) in the 1979 NBA Draft. Despite having a year of NCAA eligibility remaining due to his injury, Hubbard had declared himself for the NBA Draft.

Hubbard played in 196 games with the Pistons over 3 seasons, averaging 11.6 points, 6.0 rebounds and 1.5 assists in 23 minutes.

Cleveland Cavaliers (1982–1989) 
On February 16, 1982, Hubbard was traded by the Detroit Pistons with Paul Mokeski, a 1982 1st round draft pick (John Bagley was later selected) and a 1982 2nd round draft pick (Dave Magley was later selected) to the Cleveland Cavaliers for Kenny Carr and Bill Laimbeer.

In 8 seasons and 469 games with the Cavaliers, Hubbard averaged 10.6 points, 5.0 rebounds and 1.2 assists in 24 minutes.

Overall, Hubbard averaged 10.9 points, 5.3 rebounds and 1.3 assists in 665 career NBA games.

Career statistics

NBA

Regular season

|-
| style="text-align:left;"|
| style="text-align:left;"|Detroit
| 64 ||  || 18.6 || .466 || .000 || .750 || 5.0 || 1.1 || .8 || .2 || 9.1
|-
| style="text-align:left;"|
| style="text-align:left;"|Detroit
| 80 ||  || 28.6 || .492 || .333 || .690 || 7.3 || 1.9 || 1.0 || .3 || 14.5
|-
| style="text-align:left;"|
| style="text-align:left;"|Detroit
| 52 || 38 || 21.2 || .505 || .000 || .650 || 5.2 || 1.3 || .7 || .3 || 10.0
|-
| style="text-align:left;"|1981–82
| style="text-align:left;"|Cleveland
| 31 || 2 || 23.7 || .467 || .000 || .726 || 6.5 || .8 || .9 || .1 || 10.4
|-
| style="text-align:left;"|
| style="text-align:left;"|Cleveland
| 82 || 38 || 23.8 || .482 || .000 || .689 || 5.7 || 1.1 || 1.1 || .1 || 9.5
|-
| style="text-align:left;"|
| style="text-align:left;"|Cleveland
| 80 || 6 || 22.5 || .511 || .000 || .739 || 4.8 || 1.1 || .9 || .1 || 10.8
|-
| style="text-align:left;"|
| style="text-align:left;"|Cleveland
| 76 || 55 || 29.6 || .505 || .000 || .751 || 6.3 || 1.5 || 1.1 || .1 || 15.8
|-
| style="text-align:left;"|
| style="text-align:left;"|Cleveland
| 23 || 21 || 27.8 || .470 || .000 || .679 || 5.2 || 1.3 || .9 || .1 || 11.4
|-
| style="text-align:left;"|
| style="text-align:left;"|Cleveland
| 68 || 68 || 30.6 || .531 || .000 || .596 || 5.7 || 2.0 || 1.0 || .1 || 11.8
|-
| style="text-align:left;"|
| style="text-align:left;"|Cleveland
| 78 || 59 || 20.9 || .489 || .000 || .749 || 3.6 || 1.0 || .6 || .1 || 8.4
|-
| style="text-align:left;"|
|style="text-align:left;"|Cleveland
| 31 || 0 || 6.2 || .444 ||  || .680 || 1.3 || .4 || .2 || .0 || 2.4
|- class="sortbottom"
| style="text-align:center;" colspan="2"|Career
| 665 || 287 || 23.9 || .495 || .038 || .706 || 5.3 || 1.3 || .9 || .1 || 10.9

Playoffs

|-
| style="text-align:left;"| 1985
| style="text-align:left;"| Cleveland
| 4 || 4 || 25.3 || .553 || 1.000 || .765 || 5.0 || .8 || .8 || .0 || 15.5
|-
| style="text-align:left;"|1988
| style="text-align:left;"| Cleveland
| 3 || 0 || 7.0 || .167 ||  || .000 || 1.0 || .0 || .0 || .0 || .7
|-
| style="text-align:left"|1989
| style="text-align:left;"| Cleveland
| 1 || 0 || 1.0 ||  ||  ||  || .0 || .0 || .0 || .0 || .0
|-class="sortbottom"
|style="text-align:center;" colspan=2| Career
| 8 || 4 || 15.4 || .490 || 1.000 || .722 || 2.9 || .4 || .4 || .0 || 8.0

Coaching career
After first serving as an NBA scout after his playing career ended, Hubbard became an assistant coach in the NBA. From 1997–2009 Hubbard was an assistant coach with the Atlanta Hawks (1997–2000), Golden State Warriors (2000–2003) and Washington Wizards (2003–2009).

From 2011–2014, Hubbard coached in the NBA G League as an assistant coach with the Los Angeles D-Fenders and Santa Cruz Warriors and before becoming Head Coach of the Los Angeles D-Fenders/South Bay Lakers in 2014–2015.

In 2015, Hubbard was hired as an assistant coach for Jeonju KCC Egis in the Korean Basketball League in South Korea.

Personal

Hubbard graduated in 1979 from Michigan with a degree in Education.

Hubbard's son, Maurice, played college basketball for Ball State and USC Aiken and played high school basketball at Westfield High School in Chantilly, Virginia, a suburb of Washington, D.C.

Hubbard's daughter, Whitney, is a graduate of Hampton University and played high school volleyball also for Westfield High School.

Honors
 In 1992, Hubbard was inducted into the University of Michigan Hall of Honor.
 Hubbard's #35 jersey was retired by the University of Michigan in 2004.
 Hubbard was inducted into the Ohio Basketball Hall of Fame in 2008.

See also
 University of Michigan Athletic Hall of Honor

References

External links
 Basketball-Reference.com Profile
 NBA.com Profile

1956 births
Living people
20th-century African-American sportspeople
21st-century African-American people
African-American basketball players
All-American college men's basketball players
American expatriate basketball people in the Dominican Republic
American expatriate basketball people in South Korea
American men's basketball players
Basketball coaches from Ohio
Basketball players at the 1976 Summer Olympics
Basketball players from Canton, Ohio
Centers (basketball)
Cleveland Cavaliers players
Detroit Pistons draft picks
Detroit Pistons players
Los Angeles D-Fenders coaches
Medalists at the 1976 Summer Olympics
Michigan Wolverines men's basketball players
Olympic gold medalists for the United States in basketball
Power forwards (basketball)
United States men's national basketball team players
Washington Wizards assistant coaches